Lenox may refer to:

Places in the United States
 Lenox, Alabama, an unincorporated community
 Lenox, Georgia, a town
 Lenox, Iowa, a city
 Lenox, Kentucky, an unincorporated community and coal town
 Lenox, Massachusetts, a town
 Lenox (CDP), Massachusetts, a census-designated place in the town
 Lenox, Missouri, an unincorporated community
 Lenox, New York, a town
 Lenox Avenue, in Harlem, New York City
 Lenox, Ohio, original name of North Olmsted, Ohio
 Lenox, Oklahoma, an unincorporated community
 Lenox, Pennsylvania, an unincorporated community
 Lenox, Tennessee, an unincorporated community
 Lenox, Memphis, Tennessee, a neighborhood
 Lenox Township (disambiguation)
 Lenox Crater, near Flagstaff, Arizona

People and fictional characters
 Lennox (given name), a list of people and fictional characters named Lenox or Lennox
 Lennox (surname), a list of people and fictional characters named Lenox or Lennox

Businesses
 Lenox Hotel (disambiguation)
 Lenox (company), a manufacturer of bone china
 Lenox Industrial Tools, a manufacturer of saws and other cutting tools
 Lenox Square, a mall in Atlanta, Georgia

Schools
 Lenox College, a former college in Hopkinton, Iowa
 Lenox School for Boys, a private preparatory school in Lenox, Massachusetts
 Lenox Hall, a former resident and day school for girls and young women in St. Louis, Missouri

Other uses
 HMS Lenox, ships of the Royal Navy
 Lenox station (disambiguation)
 Lenox Library (disambiguation)
 Lenox Merchants, an American semi-professional basketball team based in Lenox, Massachusetts, from 1949 to 1959

See also
 New Lenox, Illinois, United States, a village
 Lennox (disambiguation)
 Linux, the open source Unix-like operating system kernel